Vydra (Czech feminine: Vydrová) is a Czech surname meaning "otter". Notable people with the surname include:
 Loukas Vyntra (born 1981), born Lukáš Vydra, Czech-born Greek footballer
 Lukáš Vydra (born 1973), Czech middle-distance runner
 Marek Vydra (born 1975), Czech curler
 Matěj Vydra (born 1992), Czech footballer
 Otakar Vydra (1901–1982), Czech athlete
 Stanislav Vydra (1741–1804), Czech mathematician
 Václav Vydra (actor born 1956), Czech actor
 Václav Vydra (actor, born 1876) (1876–1953), Czech actor

See also
 

Czech-language surnames